Örményes may refer to:
Örményes, Hungary, village in Jász-Nagykun-Szolnok County, Hungary
Armeniș, municipality in Caraș-Severin County, Romania

See also 
Băița de sub Codru
Urmeniș